Miodrag Pavlović (Serbian Cyrillic: Миодраг Павловић; ; 28 November 1928 – 17 August 2014) was a Serbian poet, physician writer, critic and academic. Pavlović was twice nominated for the Nobel Literature Prize.

Biography
He graduated from the University of Belgrade with a degree in medicine in year 1954. He studied foreign languages and wrote his first volume of poetry, 87 Poems. It appeared in 1952, the year the Yugoslav authorities, responding to a public address by the Croatian writer Miroslav Krleža, allowed more freedom of expression in politics and the arts.

In 1960 Pavlović was appointed director of drama at the National Theatre in Belgrade. He also worked for twenty years as editor for the leading publishing house of Prosveta.

A theme occupying Pavlović and many other intellectuals in the former Yugoslavia, Romania, Bulgaria, Macedonia, Greece and Albania, is the continuity between the ancient peoples of the Balkans and their modern-day descendants. In Pavlović's work as well as in that of the Macedonian poet Bogomil Gyuzel or the Albanian writer Ismail Kadare, there are frequent references to the ancient and medieval past. Among his historical poems, most important ones are 'Odisej na Kirkinom ostrvu' ('Odysseus on Circe's Island'), 'Eleuzijske seni' ('Elysian Shades'), 'Vasilije II Bugaroubica' ('Vasily II Bugaroctone') and 'Kosovo'.

These poems are often allegorical in nature, referring in fact to our own times, with their tales of manipulation, deceit and, especially, fear. Written directly in the present are such poems as 'Prisoner' (untitled in the Serbian original), 'Requiem', 'Strah' ('Fear'), 'Pod zemljom' ('Under the Ground') and 'Kavge' ('Feuds').

In 2012 he was awarded the German literary prize Petrarca-Preis. His work has been widely translated. In the last years of his life, he lived alternately in Tuttlingen, Germany and Belgrade, Serbia.

A street in Belgrade is named after him.

Awards
European prize for poetry, city of Münster
European prize for poetry, city of Vršac
Struga Poetry Evenings award
Vilenica Prize
Petrarca-Preis
Legion of Honour
Order of St. Sava
Ramonda Serbica
Crown of despot Stefan Lazarević
Tador Manojlović award
Desanka Maksimović award
Dis's award
Odzivi Filipu Višnjiću award
Stefan Prvovenčani admission
Vuk's award
Žička hrisovulja admission for poetry
Branko Miljkovic award
Zmaj's award
Izviskra Njegoševa award, for life's work

Works

In Serbian
Poetry:

87 pesama, Novo pokolenje, Beograd, 1952.
Stub sećanja, Novo pokolenje, Beograd, 1953.
Oktave, Nolit, Beograd, 1957.
Mleko iskoni, Prosveta, Beograd, 1963.
87 pesama (izbor poezije), Nolit, Beograd, 1963.
Velika Skitija, Svjetlost, Sarajevo, 1969.
Nova Skitija, izd. časopisa "Književnost", Beograd, 1970.
Hododarje, Nolit, Beograd, 1971.
Svetli i tamni praznici, Matica srpska, Novi Sad, 1971.
Velika Skitija i druge pesme (izabrane i nove pesme), SKZ, Beograd, 1972.
Zavetine, Rad, Beograd, 1976.
Karike, Svetlost, Kragujevac, 1977.
Pevanja na Viru, Slovo ljubve, Beograd, 1977.
Bekstva po Srbiji, Slovo ljubve, Beograd, 1979.
87 pesama, Dečje novine, Gornji Milanovac, 1979 (treće izdanje).
Izabrane pesme, Rad, Beograd, 1979.
Vidovnica, Narodna knjiga, Beograd, 1979.
Poezija I i Poezija II, u okviru Izabranih dela Miodraga Pavlovića, "Vuk Karadžić", Beograd, 1981.
Divno čudo, Nolit, Beograd, 1982.
Zlatna zavada, Gradina, Niš, 1982.
Sledstvo, SKZ, Beograd, 1985.
Poezija, Prosveta, Beograd, 1986.
Svetogorski dani i noći, Jedinstvo, Priština, 1987.
Odbrana našeg grada, Smederevska pesnička jesen, Naš glas, Smederevo, 1989.
Ulazak u Kremonu, Nolit, Beograd, 1989.
Knjiga staroslovna, SKZ, Beograd, 1989; 1991 (drugo izdanje).
Bezazlenstva, Milić Rakić, Valjevo, 1989.
On, Bratstvo-jedinstvo, Novi Sad, 1989.
Divno čudo, NIRO "Književne novine", Beograd, 1989 (drugo izdanje).
Kosmologia profanata, Grafos, Beograd, 1990.
Esej o čoveku, KOV, Vršac, 1992.
Pesme o detinjstvu i ratovima, SKZ, Beograd, 1992.
Knjiga horizonta, Prosveta, Beograd, 1993.
Nebo u pećini, Krajinski književni krug, Negotin, 1993.
Međustepenik, KOV, Vršac, 1994.
Ulazak u Kremonu, GNB "Žarko Zrenjanin" i Zenit", Zrenjanin, 1995 (drugo izdanje).
Bekstva po Srbiji i Sledstva, "Valjevska štamparija", Valjevo, 1995.
Nebo u pećini, Disovo proleće, Čačak, 1996 (drugo izdanje).
Izabrane i nove pesme, Prosveta, Beograd, 1996.
Novo ime kletve, SKC, Beograd, 1996.
Posvećenje pesme (izbor iz poezije), Prosveta, Niš, 1996.
Izabrane pesme, Zavod za udžbenike i nastavna sredstva, Beograd, 1996.
Velika Skitija i druge pesme (izabrane i nove pesme), SKZ, Beograd, 1996 (drugo izdanje).
Srbija do kraja veka (izabrane pesme), Zadužbina Desanke Maksimović, Narodna biblioteka Srbije i SKZ, Beograd, 1996.

Prose:

Most bez obala, Matica srpska, Novi Sad, 1956., 1982.
Bitni ljudi, Prosveta, Beograd, 1995.

Essays:

Rokovi poezije, SKZ, Beograd, 1958.
Osam pesnika, Prosveta, Beograd, 1964.
Dnevnik pene, Slovo ljubve, Beograd, 1972.
Poezija i kultura, Nolit, Beograd, 1974.
Poetika modernog, Grafos, Beograd, 1978. (nagrada "Đorđe Jovanović")
Ništitelji i svadbari, BIGZ, Beograd, 1979.
Nove slikarske godine Miće Popovića, "Merkur", Apatin, 1979.
Eseji o srpskim pesnicima i Poetika modernog", Beograd, 1981.
Prirodni oblik i lik, Nolit, Beograd, 1984.
Slikarstvo Mladena Srbinovića, SANU, Beograd, 1985.
Obredno i govorno delo, Prosveta, Beograd, 1986.
Poetika žrtvenog obreda, Nolit, Beograd, 1987. (Nolitova nagrada)
Govor o ničem, Gradina, Niš, 1987.
Hram i preobraženje, Sfairos, Beograd, 1989.
Čitanje zamišljenog, Bratstvo-jedinstvo, Novi Sad, 1990.
Eseji o srpskim pesnicima, SKZ, Beograd, 1992.
Ogledi o narodnoj i staroj srpskoj poeziji, SKZ, Beograd, 1993.
Poetika žrtvenog obreda, SKC, Beograd, 1996 (drugo izdanje)

Dramas:

Igre bezimenih, Prosveta, Beograd, 1963.
Koraci u podzemlju, Matica srpska, Novi Sad, 1991.

Itineraries:

Kina – oko na putu, izd. časopisa "Gradina", Niš, 1982, SKC, Beograd, 1995
Putevi do hrama, Prosveta, Niš, 1991.
Otvaraju se hilandarske dveri, Prosveta, Beograd, 1997.

Anthologies:

Antologija moderne engleske poezije (sa Sv. Brkićem), Nolit, Beograd, 1957. i 1975.
Antologija srpskog pesništva od XIII do XX veka, SKZ, Beograd, 1964.
Pesništvo evropskog romantizma, Prosveta, Beograd, 1969., 1979.
Antologija lirske narodne poezije, Vuk Karadžić, Beograd, 1982.;  "Književne novine", Beograd, 1989.
Boj na Kosovu, Narodne pesme, Prosveta, Niš, 1989.

In other languages
Books of poems:

Sobowtóry, PIW, Warszava, 1964. 
Gedichte, Suhrkamp, Frankfurt am Main, 1968. 
La voix sous la pierre, Gallimard, Paris, 1970. 
Karanici, Misla, Skopje, 1971. 
Versuri, Editura Univers, București, 1972. 
Po~iatok básne, Slovensky spisovatel, Bratislava, 1973
The Conqueror in Constantinople, New Rivers Press, New York, 1976. 
Svetli in temni prazniki, Dr`avna zalo`ba Slovenije, Ljubljana, 1977 
Pesmi, Mladinska knjiga, Ljubljana, 1977.
Jasne i ciemne swieta, Wydawnictvo Literackie, Kraków, 1980. 
Tren wojownika, Wydawnictvo Lódzkie, Lód`, 1982. 
Singing at the Whirlpool, Exile Editions, Toronto, 1983 
The Slavs beneath Parnassus, Angel Books, New Rivers Press, London, 1985. 
A Voice Locked in Stone, Exile Editions, Toronto, 1985.
Suite, Les Cahiers du Confluent, Montereau, 1986. 
Le miracle divin, Editions L'Age d'Homme, Lausanne, 1988 
Fényes és esötét ünnepek, Európa, Budapest, 1988. 
Gloria reversului, Libertatea, Novi Sad, 1989. 
Links, Exile Editions, Toronto, 1989. 
NoÈen polet, Narodna kultura, SofiÔ, 1989. 
Gesänge auf dem Wirbel, Hölderlinturm, Tübingen, 1990. 
Svetli i temni praznici, Makedonska kniga, Skopje, 1990. 
Die Tradition der Finsternis, ALKYON VERLAG, Weissach im Tal, 1994. 
Buch der Horizonte, Atempto Verlag, Tübingen, 1995. 
Selected Poems, Salt Publishing, Cromer, 2014.

Prose and other works:

Kroky ve vedlejim pokoji, Odeon, Praha, 1967. 
Hid a sammibe, Europa K., Budapest, 1969. 
Mit i poezja, Wydawnictvo Literackie, Kraków, 1979 
Opfer und Tempel, Droschl Verlag, Graz-Wien, 1993.

References

External links
 The Rastko Project
 Translated works by Miodrag Pavlović
 Obituary

20th-century Serbian poets
Writers from Novi Sad
Members of the Serbian Academy of Sciences and Arts
1928 births
2014 deaths
University of Belgrade Faculty of Medicine alumni
Struga Poetry Evenings Golden Wreath laureates
Serbian male poets
20th-century male writers